The Warwickshire Royal Horse Artillery was a Territorial Force Royal Horse Artillery battery that was formed in Warwickshire in 1908.  It was the first Territorial Force artillery unit to go overseas on active service, spending the whole of the First World War on the Western Front, mostly with 1st Cavalry Division and 29th Division.  A second line battery, 2/1st Warwickshire RHA, also served on the Western Front in 1917 and 1918 as part of an Army Field Artillery Brigade.  Post-war it was reconstituted as a Royal Field Artillery battery.

History

Formation
The Territorial Force (TF) was formed on 1 April 1908 following the enactment of the Territorial and Reserve Forces Act 1907 (7 Edw.7, c.9) which combined and re-organised the old Volunteer Force, the Honourable Artillery Company and the Yeomanry.  On formation, the TF contained 14 infantry divisions and 14 mounted yeomanry brigades.  Each yeomanry brigade included a horse artillery battery and an ammunition column.

On 18 March 1908, Warwickshire Royal Horse Artillery (Territorial Force) was proposed as a new unit and it was recognized by the Army Council on 4 June 1908.  The battery was raised by Lord Brooke at Warwick Castle.  It consisted of
Battery HQ at Leamington
Warwickshire Battery at Leamington
1st South Midland Mounted Brigade Ammunition Column also at Leamington 
The battery was equipped with four Ehrhardt 15-pounder guns and allocated as artillery support to the 1st South Midland Mounted Brigade.

First World War

In accordance with the Territorial and Reserve Forces Act 1907 (7 Edw.7, c.9) which brought the Territorial Force into being, the TF was intended to be a home defence force for service during wartime and members could not be compelled to serve outside the country. However, on the outbreak of war on 4 August 1914, many members volunteered for Imperial Service.  Therefore, TF units were split into 1st Line (liable for overseas service) and 2nd Line (home service for those unable or unwilling to serve overseas) units.  2nd Line units performed the home defence role, although in fact most of these were also posted abroad in due course.

1/1st Warwickshire
The 1st Line battery was embodied with the 1st South Midland Mounted Brigade on 4 August 1914 at the outbreak of the First World War.  Initially, the brigade moved to Diss, Norfolk and joined the 1st Mounted Division.  Later in August, a concentration of mounted brigades was ordered to take place around the Churn area of Berkshire and the brigade moved to the racecourse at Newbury.  These brigades were transferred to the new 2nd Mounted Division on 2 September.  I Brigade RHA and II Brigade RHA were formed for the division and the battery was assigned to I Brigade at Churn.

At the end of October 1914, B Battery, Honourable Artillery Company replaced it in I Brigade and the Warwickshire Battery departed for France, landing at Le Havre on 1 November.  It was therefore the first Territorial Force artillery unit to go overseas on active service. The 42nd (East Lancashire) Division had departed for Egypt from 10 September 1914, the 43rd (Wessex) Division for India on 9 October, and the 44th (Home Counties) Division also for India on 30 October, complete with their artillery batteries.  However, these divisions were to act as garrison forces and neither Egypt nor India was a theatre of war at this time: on arrival in India, the units reverted to peace-time conditions and pushed on with training to prepare for field service, and Britain did not declare war on Turkey until 5 November 1914.

Warwickshire RHA was to spend the rest of the war on the Western Front.  Initially held up by horse sickness, it was not until 4 December that the battery was attached to the 2nd Cavalry Division.  On 14 April 1915 it joined VII Brigade RHA, 1st Cavalry Division and was assigned to 9th Cavalry Brigade  While with 1st Cavalry Division, the division took part in the Second Battle of Ypres, notably the Battle of Frezenberg Ridge (913 May) and the Battle of Bellewaarde Ridge (24 May 1915), and the Battle of Flers–Courcelette (15 September 1916) as part of the Battle of the Somme.

On 23 August 1915, the battery was re-equipped, not with the expected 13 pounders but with four 18 pounders, normally employed by Royal Field Artillery batteries to support infantry.  On 21 November 1916, the battery joined XV Brigade RHA, 29th Division in exchange for the regular Y Battery RHA.

Thereafter, the battery supported 29th Division in a large number of major actions.  In 1917 this including the Battle of Arras (April to May, First, Second and Third Battles of the Scarpe), the Third Battle of Ypres (August to October, battles of Langemarck, Brodseinde and Poelcappelle) and the Battle of Cambrai (November and December, including the Tank Attack and the German Counter-attacks).

1918 likewise saw a number of major actions, including the Battle of the Lys (April, the battles of Estaires, Messines, Hazelbrouck and Bailleul), the Advance to Victory (August and September) and the Final Advance in Flanders (September and October, Fifth Battle of Ypres and Battle of Courtrai).

At the Armistice, it was still serving in XV Brigade RHA with 29th Division (equipped with six 18 pounders).  The battery advanced into Germany on 4 December 1918.  If later formed part of the British Army of the Rhine, and absorbed its 2nd line in Germany in 1919.

2/1st Warwickshire

Warwickshire RHA formed a 2nd line in 1914, initially designated as the Warwickshire (Reserve) Battery RHA and later given a fractional designation as 2/1st Warwickshire Battery, RHA.

The battery joined the 2nd line 2/1st South Midland Mounted Brigade when it was formed in April 1915.  On 6 March 1915, the 2/2nd Mounted Division was formed to replace 2nd Mounted Division which had been warned for overseas service.  The brigade joined the division on East Coast Defences in June 1915 and concentrated at Hunstanton with the battery at South Creake.

The batteries of the division were quite unready for war.  Three had no horses, the fourth had just 23; three batteries had over 200 men on average, but the other just 91; one battery had no ammunition and another reported that its 15-pounders were "practically useless".  The battery remained with the division when it was redesignated as 3rd Mounted Division in March 1916 and as 1st Mounted Division in July 1916.  It had left the division by November 1916.

Army Field Brigade
CXXVI Brigade, RFA was reformed at Heytesbury, Wiltshire in May 1917 with 2/A Battery and 2/B Battery HAC, both with six 18 pounders.  The brigade landed at Boulogne on 22 June 1917 and became an Army Field Brigade.  2/1st Warwickshire, by now also rearmed with 18 pounders, proceeded to France on 21 June 1917, joined the brigade and served with it on the Western Front for the rest of the war.

At the Armistice, the battery (by now made up to six 18 pounders) was still with CXXVI Brigade, RFA serving as Army Troops with the First Army.  The battery entered Germany after the war ended, and was amalgamated into its 1st line in 1919.

Post war
Warwickshire RHA was not reconstituted until 7 February 1920 when it formed 3rd Warwickshire Battery, RFA (later numbered 271st Battery) in 3rd South Midland Brigade, RFA, (later 68th (South Midland) Field Regiment, Royal Artillery). and ceased to be a Royal Horse Artillery battery.

See also

 List of Territorial Force horse artillery batteries 1908

Notes

References

Bibliography

External links
The Royal Horse Artillery on The Long, Long Trail
The Great War Royal Horse Artillery
 Cpl Harry Fox and the 1st/1st Warwickshire Battery RHA (TF)
 2/1st (Warwick) Bty RHA on the Great War Forum

Royal Horse Artillery batteries
Artillery units and formations of World War I
Military units and formations established in 1908
Military units and formations disestablished in 1919
Military units and formations in Warwickshire